Haneuma Rider (ハネウマライダー) is the twentieth single by the Japanese Pop-rock band Porno Graffitti. It was released on June 28, 2006.

All title of the recorded music piece has to fit the rhyme to end in "○○ Rider". This has been produced in the order of "Haneuma Rider", "June Brider", "Taneuma Rider", "The songs" Let is tied rider "" is the brainchild of members that, in the title prior to that idea Street.

Track listing

References

2006 singles
Porno Graffitti songs
2006 songs
SME Records singles